Avdotya or Avdotia is a Russian feminine given name. It is a form of the Greek name Eudoxia/Eudokia/Eudocia, held by several saints honored in the Russian Orthodox Church.
It is shared by the following people:
Avdotya Chernysheva (1693–1747), Russian noble and lady in waiting
Avdotia Istomina (Avdotya Istomina) (1799–1848), Russian ballerina
Avdotya Mikhaylova (1746–1807), Russian stage actress and opera singer
Avdotya Panaeva (1820–1893), Russian writer
Avdotya Romanovna Raskolnikova, character in Fyodor Dostoyevsky's novel Crime and Punishment
Avdotya Timofeyeva ( 1739), Russian ballerina

See also
Eudoxia (name) - covers all people, places, ships etc. named either Eudoxia or derived variants of the name

Russian feminine given names